Rosedale is a rural municipality in the province of Manitoba in Western Canada.  The southeast corner of Riding Mountain National Park overlaps the northwest corner of the RM, and comprises about one-sixth of Rosedale's territory. The Town of Neepawa borders the municipality.

Communities
 Birnie
 Eden
 Franklin
 Kelwood
 Mountain Road
 Polonia
 Riding Mountain

Demographics 

Tourism
Mountain Road Hall hosts a spring and fall craft sale

Churches 
 Living Hope Fellowship Church – Eden
 Mountainview Church of God – Eden
 Kingdom Hall of Jehovah Witness – Kelwood
 St Johns Anglican Church – Kelwood
 St. Elizabeth's Roman Catholic Church – Polonia
 St. Mary's Ukrainian Catholic Church – Mountain Road (Ukrainian: Церква)

Monuments 
 Big Valley School No. 2109
 Birnie Memorial Park
 Birnie Methodist Church
 Clarkesville School No. 1396
 Coldstream School No. 435
 Eden Consolidated School No. 1661
 Franklin School No. 780
 Iroquois School No. 303
 Kelwood Centennial Monument
 Kelwood War Memorial
 Kenilworth School / Riding Mountain School No. 1439
 Knox United Church
 Mountain Road School No. 1432
 Mountain Road Stores
 Mountain View School No. 244
 Patronage of the Blessed Virgin Mary Ukrainian Catholic Church
 Polonia School No. 732
 Riding Mountain War Memorial
 Roskeen School No. 1058
 Springhill Church
 Springhill School No. 374
 Tobarmore School No. 616

References

External links
 Official website
 Map of Rosedale R.M. at Statcan
 Patronage of the Blessed Virgin Mary Ukrainian Catholic Church (Mountain Road, RM of Rosedale) and Mountain Road Church Fire

Rosedale